Russet Hills is a line of hills trending east–west for 3.5 nautical miles (6 km) and forming the southern ridge of Gallipoli Heights in the Freyberg Mountains. Named by the New Zealand Antarctic Place-Names Committee (NZ-APC) on the proposal of P.J. Oliver, New Zealand Antarctic Research Program (NZARP) geologist who studied the hills, 1981–82. Named descriptively from the red-colored ignimbrite rock of this feature.

Features
Geographical features of Russet Hills include:

 Painted Peak

 

Hills of Victoria Land
Pennell Coast